The bluethroat  (Luscinia svecica) is a small passerine bird that was formerly classed as a member of the thrush family Turdidae, but is now more generally considered to be an Old World flycatcher, Muscicapidae. It, and similar small European species, are often called chats.

It is a migratory insectivorous species breeding in wet birch wood or bushy swamp in Europe and across the Palearctic with a foothold in western Alaska. It nests in tussocks or low in dense bushes. It winters in north Africa and the Indian subcontinent.

The bluethroat is similar in size to the European robin at 13–14 cm. It is plain brown above except for the distinctive black tail with red side patches. It has a strong white supercilium. Despite the distinctive appearance of the males, recent genetic studies show only limited variation between the forms, and confirm that this is a single species. Moults begins in July after breeding and are completed in 40–45 days, before the birds migrate.

The male has a varied and very imitative song. Its call is a typical chat chack noise.

Subspecies
See the Wikispecies page.

Females of all subspecies usually have just a blackish crescent on an otherwise cream throat and breast. Newly fledged juveniles are freckled and spotted dark brown above.

Etymology

The genus name Luscinia is  Latin for the common nightingale. The specific epithet svecica is from New Latin Suecicus meaning "Swedish". The colours of the male's breast were thought to evoke the Swedish flag, the yellow in the flag being more orange hued in the 17th and 18th centuries.

Gallery

References

External links
Bluethroat videos, photos & sounds on the Internet Bird Collection
Ageing and sexing (PDF; 3.4 MB) by Javier Blasco-Zumeta & Gerd-Michael Heinze
Information and pictures about the Bluethroat in the Netherlands
Metzmacher M. (2008) Les Grillons, muses de la Gorgebleue à miroir blanc (Luscinia svecica cyanecula) ? Parcs & Réserves, 63 : 17-19. (in French)

IUCN Red List least concern species
Luscinia
Holarctic birds
Birds of Africa
Birds described in 1758
Articles containing video clips
Taxa named by Carl Linnaeus